"Graftin'" is the sixth single from British rapper Dizzee Rascal and the third and final single from his second album Showtime. The single was a double A-side with "Off 2 Work", which was a previously unreleased new song.

The single release of "Off 2 Work" / "Graftin'" became Dizzee Rascal's lowest charting single to date and his first to miss the top forty, peaking at number forty-four, despite "Off 2 Work" being previously unreleased.

Track listing
CD 1
 "Off 2 Work"
 "Graftin'"

CD 1
 "Off 2 Work"
 "Off 2 Work" (remix)
 "Graftin'" (video)

Music video
In the video clip Dizzee rascal is with his gang in a room. Dizzee is holding money is hand. In the middle of the video clip him and his gang jump around. At one point Dizzee is in a jail station.

2004 songs
2005 singles
Dizzee Rascal songs
XL Recordings singles
Songs written by Dizzee Rascal